In the mathematical discipline of functional analysis, a differentiable vector-valued function from Euclidean space is a differentiable function valued in a topological vector space (TVS) whose domains is a subset of some finite-dimensional Euclidean space. 
It is possible to generalize the notion of derivative to functions whose domain and codomain are subsets of arbitrary topological vector spaces (TVSs) in multiple ways. 
But when the domain of a TVS-valued function is a subset of a finite-dimensional Euclidean space then many of these notions become logically equivalent resulting in a much more limited number of generalizations of the derivative and additionally, differentiability is also more well-behaved compared to the general case. 
This article presents the theory of -times continuously differentiable functions on an open subset  of Euclidean space , which is an important special case of differentiation between arbitrary TVSs. 
This importance stems partially from the fact that every finite-dimensional vector subspace of a Hausdorff topological vector space is TVS isomorphic to Euclidean space  so that, for example, this special case can be applied to any function whose domain is an arbitrary Hausdorff TVS by restricting it to finite-dimensional vector subspaces. 

All vector spaces will be assumed to be over the field  where  is either the real numbers  or the complex numbers

Continuously differentiable vector-valued functions 

Curves 

Differentiable curves are an important special case of differentiable vector-valued (i.e. TVS-valued) functions which, in particular, are used in the definition of the Gateaux derivative. They are fundamental to the analysis of maps between two arbitrary topological vector spaces  and so also to the analysis of TVS-valued maps from Euclidean spaces, which is the focus of this article. 

 
where in order for this limit to even be well-defined,  must be an accumulation point of  
If  is differentiable then it is said to be  or  if its , which is the induced map  is continuous. 
It is called ,  or  if it is -times continuously differentiable for every integer  

For any  a curve  valued in a topological vector space  is called a  if it is a topological embedding and a  curve such that  for every  where it is called a  if it is also a path (or equivalently, also a -arc) in addition to being a -embedding.

Differentiability on Euclidean space 

Throughout, let  be an open subset of  where  is an integer. 

where  
If  is differentiable at a point then it is continuous at that point. 
If  is differentiable at every point in some subset  of its domain then  is said to be ( or ) , where if the subset  is not mentioned then this means that it is differentiable at every point in its domain. 
If  is differentiable and if each of its partial derivatives is a continuous function then  is said to be ( or )  or  
The  of a function  is the closure (taken in its domain ) of the set

Spaces of Ck vector-valued functions 

In this section, the space of smooth test functions and its canonical LF-topology are generalized to functions valued in general complete Hausdorff locally convex topological vector spaces (TVSs). After this task is completed, it is revealed that the topological vector space  that was constructed could (up to TVS-isomorphism) have instead been defined simply as the completed injective tensor product  of the usual space of smooth test functions  with  

Throughout, let  be a Hausdorff topological vector space (TVS), let  and let  be either:
 an open subset of  where  is an integer, or else
 a locally compact topological space, in which case  can only be

Space of Ck functions 

Let  denote  and  denote  
Give  the topology of uniform convergence of the functions together with their derivatives of order  on the compact subsets of   
Suppose that  is a basis of neighborhoods of the origin in   Then for any integer  the sets:

Note that  is convex whenever  is convex. 
If  is metrizable (resp. complete, locally convex, Hausdorff) then so is  

Space of Ck functions with support in a compact subset 

The definition of the topology of the space of test functions is now duplicated and generalized. 
Let  denote  
For any two compact subsets  the inclusion 
 

Space of compactly support Ck functions 

For any compact subset  let 
 
denote the inclusion map and endow  with the strongest topology making all  continuous, which is known as the final topology induced by these map. 
The spaces  and maps  form a direct system (directed by the compact subsets of ) whose limit in the category of TVSs is  together with the injections  
The spaces  and maps  also form a direct system (directed by the total order ) whose limit in the category of TVSs is  together with the injections  
Each embedding  is an embedding of TVSs. 

The statement remains true if "all compact " is replaced with "all ".

Properties

Identification as a tensor product 

Suppose henceforth that  is Hausdorff. 
Given a function  and a vector  let  denote the map  defined by  
This defines a bilinear map  into the space of functions whose image is contained in a finite-dimensional vector subspace of  

If  is locally compact then  is dense in  while if  is an open subset of  then  is dense in

See also

Notes

Citations

References 

  
  
  
  
  
  
  
  
  
  
  
  

Banach spaces
Differential calculus
Euclidean geometry
Functions and mappings
Generalizations of the derivative
Topological vector spaces